Exilia graphiduloides is a species of sea snail, a marine gastropod mollusc in the family Ptychatractidae.

Description
THe length of the shell attains 53.8 mm.

Distribution
This marine species occurs off New Caledonia.

References

 Kantor Yu.I., Bouchet P. & Oleinik A. 2001. A revision of the Recent species of Exilia, formerly Benthovoluta (Gastropoda: Turbinellidae). Ruthenica 11(2): 81-136.

Ptychatractidae
Gastropods described in 2001